James George Robert Bridges, Baron Bridges of Headley,  (born 15 July 1970) is a British politician. He served as Parliamentary Under-Secretary of State at the Department for Exiting the European Union.

Education
Bridges was educated at Rokeby Preparatory School, then attended Eton College followed by Exeter College, Oxford, where he received a BA degree (later promoted to an MA by seniority).

Life and career
Bridges was Assistant Political Secretary to the Prime Minister John Major from 1994 to 1997. He was appointed a Member of the Order of the British Empire (MBE) in 1997. In the 2000s he served as Chairman of the Research Department and Campaign Director of the Conservative Party.

He was created a life peer as Baron Bridges of Headley, of Headley Heath in the County of Surrey, on 28 May 2015.

Bridges served as a parliamentary secretary at the Department for Exiting the European Union in 2016 and 2017.

Bridges serves as Chair of the Economic Affairs Committee.

Family connections
The Lord Bridges of Headley is a great-grandson of Poet Laureate Robert Bridges, and a grandson of senior civil servant Edward Bridges, 1st Baron Bridges. He is a nephew of the late crossbench peer and ambassador to Italy Thomas Bridges, 2nd Baron Bridges and of historian Margaret Aston.

References

1970 births
Alumni of Exeter College, Oxford
Bridges of Headley
Life peers created by Elizabeth II
Living people
People educated at Eton College
Members of the Order of the British Empire